The Shah Ali Banda clock tower is a clock tower located in Hyderabad, India.

History 
It was constructed in 1904, as part of Raja Rai Rayan's palace. The palace has been destroyed, but the clock tower remains.

The clock is being restored in 2020.

Clock 
The clock contains Hindu-Arabic, Roman, Hindi, and Telugu numerals.

See also 

 List of clock towers

References 

Clock towers in India